The Xeroderinae are a sub-family of stick insects in the family Phasmatidae: genera are found in tropical Asia and Australasia; there is a single tribe: the Xeroderini Günther, 1953.

Genera 
 Caledoniophasma Günther, 1953
 Cnipsus Zompro, 2001
 Dimorphodes Wood-Mason, 1878
 Epicharmus Westwood, 1859
 Leosthenes Stål, 1875
 Nisyrus Stål, 1875 (synonym Cotylosoma Wood-Mason, 1878)
 Sinoxenophasmina Ho, 2021
 Xenophasmina Uvarov, 1940
 Xeroderus Gray, 1835

References 

Phasmatidae
Phasmatodea subfamilies
Phasmatodea of Asia